Hibbertia longifolia is a small shrub that  is endemic to Queensland,  Australia.

The species was first formally described in 1864 by Victorian Government Botanist Ferdinand von Mueller in his paper Fragmenta Phytographiae Australiae based on plant material collected from Rockingham Bay.

References

longifolia
Flora of Queensland
Taxa named by Ferdinand von Mueller